This is a list of notable events in music that took place in the year 1916.

Specific locations
1916 in British music
1916 in Norwegian music

Specific genres
1916 in jazz

Events
 February 1 – Carl Nielsen conducts the première of his Symphony No. 4, the Inextinguishable, in Copenhagen.
 February 11 – Baltimore Symphony Orchestra presents its first concert.
 March 3 – The Original Dixieland Jass Band begin playing at Schiller's Cafe in Chicago, Illinois, under the name Stein's Dixie Jass Band.
 March 10 – Sir Hubert Parry writes the choral setting of William Blake's poem "And did those feet in ancient time" which becomes known as "Jerusalem" (first performed 28 March at the Queen's Hall, London).
 April 28 – Edison Records carry out the first public "comparison test" between live and recorded singing voices at Carnegie Hall, featuring soprano Marie Rappold.
 June 5 – Stein's Dixie Jass Band plays its first concert under its new name, the Original Dixieland Jass Band.
 August 3 – The musical comedy Chu Chin Chow, written, produced, directed and starring Oscar Asche, with music by Frederic Norton, premières at His Majesty's Theatre in London. It will run for five years and a total of 2,238 performances (more than twice as many as any previous musical), a West End theatre record that will stand for nearly forty years.
 December – Wilbur Sweatman records his hot ragtime for Emerson Records in New York City.
 Gustav Holst completes composition of his orchestral suite The Planets, Op. 32, in England.
 Sydney Conservatorium of Music in Australia accepts its first students.
 Soprano Hedy Iracema-Brügelmann is awarded the Charlottenkreuz.
 German soprano Vali von der Osten marries tenor Fritz Windgassen.

Published popular music
 "Allah's Holiday" w. Otto Harbach m. Rudolf Friml
 "And They Called It Dixieland" w. Raymond Egan m. Richard A. Whiting
 "Arrah Go On, I'm Gonna Go Back To Oregon" w. Sam M. Lewis & Joe Young m. Bert Grant
 "At Finnigan's Ball" w.m. Bert Lee
 "Baby Shoes" by Joe Goodwin
 "Beale Street Blues" w.m. W. C. Handy
 "A Broken Doll" w.m. James W. Tate & Frank Clifford Harris
 "Bugle Call Rag" w.m. Eubie Blake & Carey Morgan
 "Bull Frog Blues" Tom Brown, Guy Shrigley
 "The Cobbler's Song" w. Oscar Asche m. Frederic Norton
 "La Cumparsita" w. Carol Raven m. G. H. Matos Rodriguez (words written 1932)
 "Don't Leave Me, Daddy" Joe Verges
 "Down In Honky Tonky Town" w. Charles McCarron m. Chris Smith
 "Down Where The Swanee River Flows" w. Charles McCarron and Charles S. Alberte m. Albert Von Tilzer
 "For Dixie And Uncle Sam" w. J. Keirn Brennan m. Ernest R. Ball
 ""Forever" Is A Long, Long Time" w. Darl MacBoyle m. Albert Von Tilzer
 "From Here To Shanghai" w.m. Irving Berlin
 "Give Me All Of You" Schwartzwald
 "Goodbye, Good Luck, God Bless You" w. J. Keirn Brennan m. Ernest R. Ball
 "Green Hills Of Somerset" w. Fred E. Weatherly m. Eric Coates
 "Have A Heart" w. Gene Buck m. Jerome Kern
 "Homesickness Blues" w.m. Cliff Hess
 "The Honolulu Blues" w. Grant Clarke & Eddie Cox m. James V. Monaco
 "How's Every Little Thing In Dixie?" w. Jack Yellen m. Albert Gumble
 "Hula Lou" w. Edward Grossmith m. Ted D. Ward
 "I Ain't Got Nobody" w. Roger Graham & Dave Peyton m. Spencer Williams
 "I Can Dance With Everybody But My Wife" w. Joseph Cawthorn & John Golden m. John Golden
 "I Sent My Wife To The Thousand Isles" w. Andrew B. Sterling & Ed Moran m. Harry von Tilzer
 "I Want To Marry A Male Quartette" w. Otto Harbach m. Rudolf Friml
 "If I Knock The "L" Out Of Kelly" w. Sam M. Lewis & Joe Young m. Bert Grant
 "If You Were the Only Girl (in the World)" w. Clifford Grey m. Nat D. Ayer
 "I'm Sorry I Made You Cry" w.m. N. J. Clesi
 "Ireland Must Be Heaven, for My Mother Came from There" w. Joseph McCarthy & Howard Johnson m. Fred Fisher
 "I've A Shooting Box In Scotland" w.m. Thomas Lawrason Riggs & Cole Porter
 "Joe Turner Blues" w. Walter Hirsch m. W. C. Handy
 "Katinka" w. Otto Harbach m. Rudolf Friml
 "Keep Your Eye On The Girlie You Love" w. Howard Johnson & Alex Gerber m. Ira Schuster
 "The Laddies Who Fought And Won" w.m. Harry Lauder
 "Li'l Liza Jane" w.m. Countess Ada De Lachau
 "Love Me At Twilight" w. William Jerome & Joe Young m. Bert Grant
 "Mammy's Little Coal Black Rose" w. Raymond Egan m. Richard Whiting
 "M-I-S-S-I-S-S-I-P-P-I" w, Bert Hanlon & Benny Ryan m. Harry Tierney
 "Movie Trot" m. Harry H. Raymond

 "The Moving Picture Hero Of My Heart" w. Roger Lewis m. Ernie Erdman
 "My Hawaiian Sunrise" w.m. L. Wolfe Gilbert & Carey Morgan
 "My Syncopated Melody Man" w.m. Blanche Merrill & Eddie Cox
 "Nat'an, For What Are You Waitin', Nat'an" w.m. James Kendris
 "Naughty! Naughty! Naughty!" w. Joe Goodwin & William Tracey m. Nat Vincent
 "Never Let The Same Bee Sting You Twice" w.m. Cecil Mack & Chris Smith
 "O'Brien Is Tryin' To Learn To Talk Hawaiian" w. Al Dubin m. Rennie Cormack
 "Oh! How She Could Yacki, Hacki, Wicki, Wacki, Woo" w. Stanley Murphy & Charles McCarron m. Albert Von Tilzer
 "Operatic Rag" J. Lensberg
 "Poor Butterfly" w. John Golden m. Raymond Hubbell
 "Pretty Baby" w. Gus Kahn m. Tony Jackson & Egbert Van Alstyne
 "Rackety Coo!" w. Otto Harbach m. Rudolf Friml
 "Rolling Stones – All Come Rolling Home Again" w. Edgar Leslie m. Archie Gottler
 "Roses of Picardy" w. Frederick Weatherly m. Haydn Wood
 "Shamrock Rag" m. Euday L. Bowman
 "She Is The Sunshine Of Virginia" w. Ballard MacDonald m. Harry Carroll
 "Sierra Sue" w.m. Joseph Buell Carey
 "Someone Else May Be There While I'm Gone" w.m. Irving Berlin
 "Sweet Cider Time When You Were Mine" w. Joe McCarthy m. Percy Wenrich

 "Take Me Back to Dear Old Blighty" w.m. A. J. Mills, Fred Godfrey & Bennett Scott
 "That Funny Jas Band From Dixieland" w.m. Henry I. Marshal
 "There's A Little Bit Of Bad In Every Good Little Girl" w. Grant Clarke m. Fred Fisher
 "There's A Quaker Down In Quaker Town" w. David Berg m. Alfred Solman
 "They Made It Twice As Nice as Paradise and They Called It Dixieland" w. Raymond Egan m. Richard Whiting
 "They're Wearing 'Em Higher In Hawaii" w. Joe Goodwin m. Halsey K. Mohr
 "Throw Me A Rose" w. P. G. Wodehouse & Herbert Reynolds m. Emmerich Kallman
 "Turn Back The Universe And Give Me Yesterday" w. J. Keirn Brennan m. Ernest R. Ball
 "Walkin' The Dog" Shelton Brooks
 "What Do You Want to Make Those Eyes at Me For?" w. Joseph McCarthy & Howard Johnson m. James V. Monaco
 "When John McCormack Sings A Song" w. William Jerome & E. Ray Goetz m. Jean Schwartz
 "When You're Down In Louisville" w.m. Irving Berlin
 "Where Did Robinson Crusoe Go With Friday On Saturday Night?" w. Sam M. Lewis & Joe Young m. George W. Meyer
 "Where The Black-Eyed Susans Grow" w. Dave Radford m. Richard Whiting
 "Yaacka Hula Hickey Dula" w.m. E. Ray Goetz, Joe Young & Pete Wendling
 "You Belong To Me" w. Harry B. Smith m. Victor Herbert
 "You Can't Get Along With 'Em Or Without 'Em" w. Grant Clarke m. Fred Fisher
 "You're In Love" w. Otto Harbach & Edward Clark m. Rudolf Friml

Hit recordings

"O Sole Mio" by Enrico Caruso
"Santa Lucia" by Enrico Caruso
"Somewhere a Voice is Calling" by John McCormack
"Where Did Robinson Crusoe Go With Friday On Saturday Night?" by Al Jolson
"I Love a Piano" by Billy Murray
"Pretty Baby" by Billy Murray
"I'm Gonna Make Hay While the Sun Shines in Virginia" by Marion Harris
"Keep the Home Fires Burning ('Till the Boys Comes Home)" by James F. Harrison
"There's A Long Long Trail A-Winding" by James F. Harrison
"Ireland Must Be Heaven, For My Mother Came From There" by Charles Harrison

Classical music
 Kurt Atterberg – Symphony no. 3, "West Coast Pictures"
 Béla Bartók – Suite for Piano
 Ernest Bloch – 
Israel Symphony
String Quartet No. 1
 Lili Boulanger – Psaume 24
 Claude Debussy – Sonata for flute, viola, and harp
 Frederick Delius – Cello Sonata
 George Enescu – Piano Trio in A minor
 Alexander Glazunov – Karelian Legend
 Jesus Guridi – Una aventura de Don Quijote
 Paul Hindemith – Cello Concerto in E-flat, Op. 3
 Ludvig Holm – Concerto for violin and orchestra in G major
 Charles Ives – Fourth Symphony
 Scott Joplin
 Symphony No. 1 (lost)
 Piano Concerto (lost)
 Erkki Melartin – Symphony no 5 in A minor, Op. 90 ("Sinfonia brevis")
 Henrique Oswald – Sonata-Fantasia in E-flat major, Op. 44 (cello and piano)
 Hubert Parry – "Jerusalem"
 Siegfried Salomon – Concerto for Violin and Orchestra in G minor
 Igor Stravinsky – Renard: Burlesque for 4 pantomimes and chamber orchestra
 Heitor Villa-Lobos –
Second Cello Sonata
String Quartet No. 3
Symphony No. 1 "O imprevisto" (The Unforeseen)

Opera
Rutland Boughton – The Round Table
Enrique Granados – Goyescas,  Metropolitan Opera, New York City, 28 January
Erwin Lendvai – Elga
Manuel Penella – El Gato Montés
Felix Weingartner – Dame Kobold
Charles Villiers Stanford and Cairns James, The Critic, or An Opera Rehearsed

Film
Joseph Carl Breil – The Birth of a Nation
Victor Herbert – The Fall of a Nation

Jazz

Musical theater
 Betty Broadway production opened at the Globe Theatre on October 2 and ran for 63 performances
 Broadway And Buttermilk Broadway production opened at Maxine Elliott's Theatre on August 15 and ran for 23 performances
 Chu Chin Chow London production opened at His Majesty's Theatre on August 31 and ran for a record 2238 performances.
 Follow Me Broadway production opened at the Casino Theatre on November 29 and ran for 78 performances
 Pell Mell London production opened at the Ambassadors Theatre on June 5 and ran for 298 performances
 Robinson Crusoe Jr Broadway production opened on February 17 at the Winter Garden Theatre and ran for 139 performances
 So Long Letty Broadway production opened at the Shubert Theatre on October 23 and ran for 96 performances
 Sybil Broadway production opened on January 10 at the Liberty Theatre and ran for 168 performances.  Starring Julia Sanderson, Donald Brian and Joseph Cawthorn.
 We're All in It London revue opened at the Empire Theatre on July 13
Ziegfeld Follies Of 1916 Broadway revue opened at the New Amsterdam Theatre on June 12 and ran for 112 performances

Births
January 4 – Slim Gaillard, jazz musician (d. 1991)
January 9 – Vic Mizzy, television theme composer (d. 2009)
January 14 – Maxwell Davis, R&B musician (d. 1970)
January 15 – Artie Shapiro, jazz bassist (d. 2003)
January 16 – Rudolf Benesh, developer of the Benesh Movement Notation for dancing (d. 1975)
January 22 – Henri Dutilleux, French composer (d. 2013)
February 5 – Daniel Santos, singer (d. 1992)
February 8 – Jimmy Skidmore, jazz musician (d. 1998)
February 22 – Pedro Junco, composer (d. 1939)
February 29 – Dinah Shore, singer (d. 1994)
March 6 – Red Callender, jazz musician (d. 1992)
March 10 – Jan Håkan Åberg, organist and composer (d. 2012)
March 15 – Harry James, bandleader (d. 1983)
March 17 – Ray Ellington, singer and bandleader (d. 1985)
March 21 – Bismillah Khan, shehnai player (d. 2006)
March 26 – Harry Rabinowitz, screen music composer and conductor (d. 2016)
April 11 – Alberto Ginastera, Argentinian composer (d. 1983)
April 12 – Russell Garcia, film score composer (d. 2011)
April 14 – Denis ApIvor, composer (d. 2004)
April 15 – Lee Vincent, DJ and orchestra leader (d. 2007)
April 22 – Yehudi Menuhin, violinist (d. 1999)
April 30 – Robert Shaw, conductor (d. 1999)
May 6 – Adriana Caselotti, voice (and model) for Snow White (d. 1997)
May 9 – Bernard Rose, organist and composer (d. 1996)
May 10 – Milton Babbitt, composer (d. 2011)
May 17 – Paul Quinichette, jazz musician (d. 1983)
May 21 – Lydia Mendoza, guitarist and singer (d. 2007)
May 26 – Moondog, singer, percussionist, composer and inventor of musical instruments (d. 1999)
June 8 – Freddie Webster, jazz musician (d. 1947)
June 15 – Horacio Salgán, tango pianist, composer and orchestra leader (d. 2016)
June 17 – Einar Englund, Finnish composer (died 1999)
June 26 – Giuseppe Taddei, operatic baritone (d. 2010)
July 9
Dean Goffin, Salvation Army composer (d. 1984)
Edward Heath, Prime Minister of the United Kingdom, organist and conductor (d. 2005)
July 12 – Sam Taylor, jazz musician (d.1980)
July 16 – Miles Copeland, Jr., musician and CIA agent (d. 1991)
July 24 – Bob Eberly, American singer with Jimmy Dorsey's Orchestra (d. 1981)
July 28 – Rosina Raisbeck, operatic mezzo-soprano (d. 2006)
 July 29 – Charlie Christian, swing and jazz guitarist (d. 1942)
 August 3 – Claude Demetrius, songwriter (d. 1988)
August 18 – Moura Lympany, pianist (d. 2005)
August 21 – Bill Lee, singer (d. 1980)
 August 24 – Léo Ferré, singer, songwriter and composer (d. 1993)
August 27 – Martha Raye, American singer and actress (d. 1994)
September 8 – René Touzet, pianist, composer and bandleader (d. 2003)
September 16 – M. S. Subbulakshmi, Carnatic vocalist (d. 2004)
October 3 – David Mann, songwriter (d. 2002)
October 19
Karl-Birger Blomdahl, composer and conductor (d. 1968)
Emil Gilels, Ukrainian classical pianist (d. 1985)
 October 28 – Bill Harris, jazz trombonist (d. 1973)
 October 29 – Hadda Brooks, pianist, singer and composer (d. 2002)
 November 6 – Ray Conniff, trombonist and bandleader (d. 2002)
 November 10 – Billy May, composer and arranger (d. 2004)
 November 15 – Greta Gynt, singer, dancer and actress (d. 2000)
 November 29 - Helen Clare, British singer (d. 2018)
 December 11 – Perez Prado, Cuban bandleader and composer (d. 1989)
 December 15 – Buddy Cole, jazz musician (d. 1964)
December 18 – Betty Grable, star of many Hollywood musicals (d. 1973)
December 25
Oscar Moore, jazz guitarist (d. 1981)
Graciela Naranjo, Venezuelan singer and actress (d. 2001)
December 27 – Johnny Frigo, American jazz violinist and bassist (d. 2007)
Paddy Fahey, Irish fiddler (d. 2019)

Deaths
January 16 – Charles A. Zimmerman, composer (b. 1861)
January 21 – George Musgrove, theatre and opera producer (b. 1854)
February 4 – Adolphe Biarent, cellist and composer (b. 1871)
February 5 – Francesco Marconi, operatic tenor (b. 1853/1855)
February 20 – Giovanni Sbriglia, operatic tenor and singing teacher (b. 1832)
March 7 – José Ferrer, guitarist (b. 1835)
March 24 – Enrique Granados, composer (b. 1867)
May 11 – Max Reger, composer (b. 1873)
May 13
Clara Louise Kellogg, singer (b. 1842)
Jessie MacLachlan, Gaelic singer (b. 1866)
May 28 – Albert Lavignac, musicologist and composer (b. 1846)
June 5 – Mildred J. Hill, songwriter (b. 1859)
June 10 – Max Vogrich, pianist and composer (b. 1852)
August 2 – Hamish MacCunn, composer (b. 1868)
August 5 – George Butterworth, composer (b. 1885) (killed in action)
August 8 – Franz Eckert, composer (b. 1852)
September 10 – Friedrich Gernsheim, pianist, conductor and composer (b. 1839)
September 15 – Julius Fučík, composer (b. 1872)
November 2 – Marie Wieck, pianist, singer, piano teacher and composer (b. 1832)
November 13 – Frederick Septimus Kelly, composer and Olympic rower (b. 1881) (killed in action)
November 23 – Eduard Nápravník, conductor and composer (b. 1839)
November 24 – John Francis Barnett, composer and music teacher (b. 1837)
December 2 – Francesco Paolo Tosti, composer and music teacher (b. 1846)
December 5 – Hans Richter, conductor (b. 1843)
December 20 – William Gilchrist, composer (b. 1846)
December 28 – Eduard Strauss, composer (b. 1835)
December 31 – Ernst Rudorff, composer and music teacher (b. 1840)
date unknown – Charlie Case, vaudeville entertainer (b. c. 1860)

References

 
20th century in music
Music by year